The Women's Scratch was one of the 9 women's events at the 2010 UCI Track Cycling World Championships, held in Ballerup, Denmark on 26 March 2010.

24 Cyclists participated in the contest. The competition consisted of 40 laps, making a total of 10 km.

Results

References

Results

Women's scratch
UCI Track Cycling World Championships – Women's scratch
UCI